Tabebuia ochracea, known as corteza amarillia in Spanish, is a timber tree native to South America, Cerrado and Pantanal vegetation in Brazil. It is very similar, closely related to, and often confused with the Golden Trumpet Tree, Tabebuia chrysotricha. It is a seasonal flowering tree, blossoming only during spring (September). During this time, all leaves fall and only flowers remain in the crown.

There are three subspecies:
 Tabebuia ochracea ssp. heterotricha
 Tabebuia ochracea ssp. neochrysantha
 Tabebuia ochracea ssp. ochracea

Notes

References
  Lorenzi, Harri (1992) Árvores Brasileiras (Brazilian Trees) Nova Odessa: Plantarum. p. 52
  POTT, A. POTT, V.J. (1994) Plantas do Pantanal. (Plants of Pantanal) EMBRAPA  p. 59

ochracea
Trees of Brazil
Endemic flora of Brazil
Flora of the Cerrado
Garden plants of South America
Ornamental trees
Trees of Peru
Trees of South America